Lasse Lavrsen (born 11 January 1963 in Hvidovre, Denmark) is a Danish curler and curling coach, a three-time  and seven-time Danish men's champion.

He participated at the 2002 Winter Olympics where the Danish men's team finished in seventh place.

Teams

Men's

Mixed

Record as a coach of national teams

Personal life

References

External links

Living people
1963 births
Sportspeople from Copenhagen
Curlers at the 2002 Winter Olympics
Olympic curlers of Denmark
Danish male curlers
Danish curling champions
Danish curling coaches
People from Hvidovre Municipality
20th-century Danish people